Teresa Duran i Armengol (16 December 1949 Barcelona) is a Catalan writer and illustrator.

She specializes in children's and youth books, both in the field of creation and research, literary or other critical forms of teaching, and dissemination.

Life 
Duran, a graphic designer and doctor in Pedagogy, is professor of the Department of Didactics of Visual and Plastic Education, at the University of Barcelona. Her doctoral thesis, Els suports narratius dins children's literature (2001), won the extraordinary prize of the Faculty of Pedagogy, and was subsequently published as Albums i altres lectures: anàlisi dels llibres per a infants (2007).

Within the Catalan language sphere, she is better known as a writer and critic of illustrated children's literature. She has also been curator and coordinator of many literary or cultural exhibitions for high level state and local entities, and has scripted for public or museum audiovisual media and has received many national and international awards for her literary and pedagogical work.
She has written more than one hundred books for children and young people. 
She has also translated such works as Contes per telèfon by Gianni Rodari or Els ultims gegants by François Place, and has collaborated in different children's magazines.

In 2007, she received the Cruz de Sant Jordi.

Works 
 Children's Literature
l`arbre (1981)
la lum (1983, premio Folch i Torres 1982)
A les fosques (1989)
El pitjor llop (Premio Crítica Serra d'Or de Literatura Infantil i Juvenil 1995)
Barbablava (1998)
Mares a l'engròs (2000)
Secrets de la selva fosca (2001)
Quinzemons. Recull de contes interculturals (2001)
A pas de pallasso (2004)
Paraula de gos (2004).
 Theater
Les dues velles i els dotze mesos (1996)
 Scripts
El gegant del pi (1994)
La volta al món en 80 dies (1998)

References

External links

 Teresa Duran Armengol on Dialnet

1949 births
Living people
Writers from Catalonia
Translators from Catalonia
People from Barcelona
Spanish children's writers
Spanish women children's writers